"Big Time Sensuality" is a song by Icelandic singer and songwriter Björk, released as the fourth single from her debut album, Debut (1993). Written by Björk and staple collaborator Nellee Hooper and produced by Hooper, "Big Time Sensuality" is a house-influenced song that helped boost Björk's popularity worldwide, particularly in the US, where she charted for the first time.

The lyrics deal with her relationship with her friends and Hooper. The song features house grooves and electronic bass-sounds.

Background

After leaving the Sugarcubes, Björk traveled to London where she began having contacts with electronic music, and that inspired her to change her musical style from the pop-rock sounds of the Sugarcubes to a more alternative and electronic style of music. "Big Time Sensuality" was one of the last songs to be written for Debut, and was originally planned to be the first single from the album, but it got delayed by the release of "Human Behaviour". It was then intended to be the third single, but it got delayed again by the success of "Play Dead", and was finally released as the fourth single on 22 November 1993.

The song was co-written by Björk and Nellee Hooper and produced by Hooper, which helped her in writing and producing her first two albums. The singer's meeting with Hooper inspired her in writing the song: "I think it's quite rare, when you're obsessed with your job, as I am, when you met someone who's your other part jobwise and enables you to do what you completely want". The lyrics deal with enjoying life to its fullest and, in spite of its name, it was inspired by Björk's friends. The lyrics deal also with braveness: "I’ve got a lot of courage, but I’ve also got a lot of fear. You should allow yourself to be scared. It’s one of the prime emotions. You might almost enjoy it, funny as it sounds, and find that you can get over it and deal with it. If you ignore these things, you miss so much. But when you want to enjoy something, especially when it’s something you’ve just been introduced to, you’ve got to have a lot of courage to do it. I don’t think I’m more courageous than most people. I’m an even mixture of all those prime emotions".

After the release of Debut, Björk's songs received numerous remixes from different producers. "Big Time Sensuality" received three different remixes from Fluke. One of them, called the "Fluke Minimix",was performed on different occasions and a music video was made of it. This version was not available until the release of Björk's Greatest Hits, as the version featured on the single was shorter.

The single also contained "Glóra" ("Gloria") and "Síðasta Ég" ("The Last Me") as B-sides, two songs that were recorded by The Elgar Sisters, a group formed in the early eighties by guitarist Guðlaugur Kristinn Óttarsson and Björk. "Glóra" is an instrumental track which features a flute-solo played by Björk, who also wrote and produced the track. "Síðasta Ég" was written by Björk, Óttarsson and Þór Eldon Jónsson, a member of the Sugarcubes, and was produced by Björk and Óttarsson, with guitar played by Óttarsson.

Composition

The first two verses of "Big Time Sensuality" are underscored by upbeat keyboards that lead into electronica and techno-influenced grooves that Sandy Masuo of Option defined as "brooding". Björk belts out the first lines accompanied by a base of percussion, while the chorus features stronger electronic beats. After the first two verses, Björk sings some sounds like moans or shouts. Ben Thompson defined the yells sequence as "sinuous pop-funk squawk". After the interlude "I don't know my future after this weekend/And I don't want to!" funk-like sounds lead the song to an end.

The "Fluke Minimix" is composed on a series of synthesizers and by slower vocals. The remix features electronic bass and heavily uses reverb. The track ends with the lines "It takes courage to enjoy it/The hardcore/And the gentle/Of Big Time Sensuality" whispered by Björk.

Critical reception
The song was deemed as a highlight of Debut and was praised by critics. Reviewing the album, Heather Phares of AllMusic, noted that "Björk's playful energy ignites the dance-pop-like "Big Time Sensuality" and turns the genre on its head with "There's More to Life Than This." Recorded live at the Milk Bar Toilets, it captures the dancefloor's sweaty, claustrophobic groove, but her impish voice gives it an almost alien feel". The website cites the track as an All Media Network-pick, and in a track review, Stacia Proefrock defined it as an "aggressive, screechy dance number" that "While not scraping the top of the charts[...] was part of an album unusual enough to stand out among its fellow pop releases as a quirky and complex experiment that worked most of the time". Larry Flick from Billboard wrote, "Wiggly bass and heavy beat come to the fore here, unfortunately competing with Björk's voice for lead billing, when her vocal really should be allowed to steal the show." Sean McCarthy of the Daily Vault defined the track as "insanely addictive". John Hamilton from Idolator felt that "this dancefloor monster resembles the soulful American house sounds of Crystal Waters and Ultra Nate in its original album mix, but for the single, it was revamped into a storming trance jam by remix duo Fluke." 

Martin Aston from Music Week gave it four out of five, stating that it "sees the ubiquitous star this time going for the big dancefloor smash", adding that "she can do no wrong right now." Simon Reynolds of The New York Times stated that "the sultry Big Time Sensuality has her vaulting from chesty growls to hyperventilating harmonies so piercing she sounds as if she’s inhaled helium". Johnny Dee from NME commented, "More fun, madness and surprise follows", noting "the pulsating grind" of the song. Tim Jeffery from the RM Dance Update noted, "That soaring voice starts the track over swirling synths before a deep and rumbling bassline powers in and the rest is history repeated as Bjork heads for another smash." German band Culture Beat reviewed it for Smash Hits, giving it four out of five. Tania Evans said, "She really knows how to express herself as an artist and I like the irregularity of her phrasing and the way she uses her voice. She is unique." Jay Supreme added, "I love her, her voice is real good. This song comes from a different angle but you can tell that it's definitely her." Vox journalist Lucy O'Brien called it "saucy". 

"Big Time Sensuality" was nominated in the Best Song category at the 1994 MTV Europe Music Awards, losing to "7 Seconds" by Youssou N'Dour and Neneh Cherry. In 1995, the song was awarded one of ASCAP's Rhythm & Soul Awards.

Music video

Background and synopsis

To shoot the music video for "Big Time Sensuality", Björk called upon Stéphane Sednaoui, who had previously directed videos for Madonna, U2, and Red Hot Chili Peppers. Sednaoui heard about Björk when he went to Los Angeles for the first time and declared to be fascinated by her music. Björk personally wanted the director after seeing some photos of Kurt Cobain shot by him, that Björk recalled as being the only photos in which she saw Cobain "laughing out loud and dancing".

Sednaoui at first wanted to go to Iceland to shoot the music video, but the costs were too high for the budget. Björk explained the inspiration for the music video: "when you're living on the edge and it's about the courage to enjoy life". The director got the idea for the music video while he was in New York and realised that "it would work amazingly with the city. With all the big buildings and everything and her voice".

The video for "Big Time Sensuality" was shot in black and white on 26 October 1993 and features Björk dancing on the back of a moving truck slowly driving through New York City in the middle of the day. Björk appears in a white dress and with her typical hairstyle. The video uses film effects like slow motion and fast motion. The video was released in two versions: one with the album/single version and one featuring a remix by Fluke. This version is an edit of the full "Fluke Moulimix" that was longer than the edit provided for radio ("The Fluke Minimix"). There is also a rare nighttime version which was released only on the director's label The Work of Stephane Sednaoui DVD as well as an uncut alternative daytime version.

The video helped Björk to be known in North America where it received heavy rotation on MTV channels, with many noting that the video was more known in the country than the song: "Few people know how the melody for "Big Time Sensuality" starts, but anyone who watched MTV in  the early '90s could cheerfully belt out the single measure when she sings the words "Big Time Sensuality".

Usage in media
The video was later spoofed by British comedians French & Saunders, in a low budget fashion (i.e., on a greenscreen), and also plays on the name of Iceland, Björk's home country, with the store of the same name. A short scene of the video can be seen in the movie Vanilla Sky (2001) in a vision sequence Tom Cruise has.

Live performances
The song received a heavy promotion, and as such, Björk did numerous TV appearances. On 8 August 1993, she appeared on the UK show The Beat, performing the song along with "Venus as a Boy" and "Come to Me". Björk performed the song live on other British shows like Dance Energy, Top of the Pops and Smash Hits Poll Winners Party. She then performed the song live on The Tonight Show with Jay Leno, in one of her first appearance on the American broadcast. She performed the track on MTV's Most Wanted, where she performed also "Human Behaviour", and on The Grind. On a rare lip-synch performance, she sang the song on the Italian show Festivalbar. She also performed the song live, dressed in a big, red gown at the 1994 MTV Europe Music Awards, where she received two nominations. The song was part of her MTV Unplugged set list, where it received a different arrangement, accompanied by Indian Instruments and a harpsichord. Its performance was released on Debut Live, which was included in Live Box.

"Big Time Sensuality" was a staple performance at her Debut Tour and Post Tour. Notably, its performance during the Post Tour at the O2 Shepherd's Bush Empire in London was released on her VHS and DVD release Live at Shepherds Bush Empire, with the same performance released on Post Live, where it was given a "much more minimal treatment" accompanied by Leila Arab "gently hyperkinetic jungle beats".

Accolades
The information regarding accolades attributed to "Big Time Sensuality" is adapted from Acclaimed Music, except where otherwise noted.

Track listings

Charts

Weekly charts

Year-end charts

See also
 List of number-one dance singles of 1994 (U.S.)

References

External links
 Big Time Sensuality webpage

1993 singles
Björk songs
Number-one singles in Iceland
Dance-pop songs
Music videos directed by Stéphane Sednaoui
Songs written by Nellee Hooper
Song recordings produced by Nellee Hooper
Black-and-white music videos
1993 songs
One Little Indian Records singles
Songs written by Björk
House music songs
UK Independent Singles Chart number-one singles